Joan Martínez Vilaseca (4 March 1943 – 19 September 2021) was a Spanish professional footballer, and a manager. He also worked as the scout and youth team director in FC Barcelona.

Playing career
Born in Manresa, Barcelona, Catalonia, Vilaseca started his professional career in Espanyol and played for a long time appearing in first and second division and, after Espanyol, he joined Levante for two seasons. In his playing career he played in different positions as a forward, central midfielder and as a left back.

Coaching career
Vilaseca managed Barcelona amateur teams and managed the B team for a long time and worked in different roles in Barcelona before his retirement. He worked as scout and head of youth development for a long time. Throughout his 29 years linked to Barcelona academy, Martínez Vilaseca has signed players such as Guillermo Amor, Iván de la Peña, Luis García, Mikel Arteta, Xavi Hernández, Sergio García, Cesc Fàbregas and Bojan Krkić, Andrés Iniesta, Carles Puyol, and so many great talents for Barcelona.

References

1943 births
2021 deaths
Footballers from Manresa
Spanish footballers
Association football fullbacks
Association football forwards
Association football midfielders
La Liga players
Segunda División players
Segunda División B players
RCD Espanyol footballers
Levante UD footballers
Spanish football managers
Segunda División managers
FC Barcelona Atlètic managers